Paisiy may be:
 the  Bulgarian form of the name Paisius (see there for a list of people with the name)
 the common Bulgarian name of the 18th-century Paisius of Hilendar
 Paisiy (village), a village in Bulgaria
 Paisiy Peak, a mountain in the Antarctic